Ronald Stacey King (born January 29, 1967) is an American sports announcer and retired National Basketball Association (NBA) center who won three consecutive championships with the Chicago Bulls from 1991 to 1993. King is currently a co-lead color commentator for Chicago Bulls television broadcasts.

NBA career (1989–1999)
After a stand-out career at the University of Oklahoma, King was selected by the Bulls in the 1989 NBA draft with the sixth pick. He was projected by many as a number one pick candidate heading into draft night, but slipped. He was one of three first-round picks by the Bulls in that draft (the other two were B. J. Armstrong and Jeff Sanders).  He played four and a half seasons in Chicago before being traded during the 1993–94 campaign to the Minnesota Timberwolves in exchange for 7'2" Australian-born center Luc Longley. He was last active in the NBA during the 1996–97 season while playing a handful of games for both the Dallas Mavericks and Boston Celtics.

Post NBA career

Coaching (2001–2003)
King was named the head coach of the CBA's Rockford Lightning in 2001. The team reached the CBA championship game in 2002 with King as coach.

TV commentary (2006–present)
King began his career with CSN Chicago as a studio analyst for pre- and post-game shows for the Chicago Bulls. He filled in as a third commentator during the 2006 playoffs joining Johnny "Red" Kerr and Tom Dore. He was permanently added during the 2007 season. In 2008, Tom Dore was replaced by Neil Funk and Kerr's duties were significantly reduced, leading King to become the lead color commentator for the Bulls alongside Neil Funk. King is currently working as a color commentator for Chicago Bulls television broadcasts on NBC Sports Chicago.

King's popularity as an announcer has grown thanks to his great enthusiasm as well as his signature catch-phrases and nicknames. King has received a lot of attention in particular for his calls of highlight plays by Derrick Rose when he was with the Bulls.

References

External links

1967 births
Living people
20th-century African-American sportspeople
21st-century African-American people
African-American basketball players
All-American college men's basketball players
American expatriate basketball people in Argentina
American expatriate basketball people in Italy
American expatriate basketball people in Turkey
American men's basketball players
Antalya Büyükşehir Belediyesi players
Atenas basketball players
Basketball coaches from Oklahoma
Basketball players from Oklahoma
Boston Celtics players
Centers (basketball)
Chicago Bulls announcers
Chicago Bulls draft picks
Chicago Bulls players
Continental Basketball Association coaches
Dallas Mavericks players
Grand Rapids Hoops players
Miami Heat players
Minnesota Timberwolves players
Oklahoma Sooners men's basketball players
Sioux Falls Skyforce (CBA) players
Sportspeople from Lawton, Oklahoma